Robert Thomas Ashmore (February 22, 1904 – October 5, 1989) was a U.S. Representative from South Carolina, cousin of John D. Ashmore.

Born on a farm near Greenville, South Carolina, Ashmore attended the public schools of Greenville. He graduated from Furman University Law School, Greenville, South Carolina, in 1927. While a student he engaged in agricultural work, retail sales, and as a substitute rural mail carrier. He was admitted to the bar in January 1928 and engaged in the practice of law in Greenville, South Carolina. He served as solicitor of Greenville County Court 1930–1934, and then as solicitor of the thirteenth judicial circuit of South Carolina 1936–1953. During World War II, while on official leave from duties as solicitor, Ashmore volunteered for service in the United States Army in December 1942, serving in the United States and overseas until discharged from active duty in May 1946, as a lieutenant colonel in the United States Army Reserve. He was promoted to colonel in 1955.

Ashmore was elected as a Democrat to the Eighty-third Congress to fill the vacancy caused by the death of Joseph R. Bryson. He was reelected to the Eighty-fourth and to the six succeeding Congresses (June 2, 1953 – January 3, 1969), during which time he was a signatory to the 1956 Southern Manifesto that opposed the desegregation of public schools ordered by the Supreme Court in Brown v. Board of Education. He was not a candidate for reelection in 1968 to the Ninety-first Congress. He resumed the practice of law.

He served as member of the board of South Carolina Appalachian Regional Planning and Development Commission (later South Carolina Appalachian Council of Governments) from 1970 to 1989, and chairman from 1970 to 1972. Ashmore was also elected to the Common Cause National Governing Board in 1973. He was a resident of Greenville, South Carolina, until his death there on October 5, 1989. He was interred in White Oak Baptist Church Cemetery, Greenville, South Carolina.

Sources

Robert T. Ashmore Papers can be found at South Carolina Political Collections at the University of South Carolina.

1904 births
1989 deaths
People from Greenville, South Carolina
Military personnel from South Carolina
South Carolina state solicitors
Baptists from South Carolina
United States Army officers
Democratic Party members of the United States House of Representatives from South Carolina
20th-century American politicians
20th-century Baptists
American segregationists